Bobby R. Acord was the Administrator of the USDA's Animal and Plant Health Inspection Service (APHIS).  He was appointed by Ann Veneman on November 7, 2001, and was no longer administrator .  

Prior to his appointment, he had served for over a decade in the upper echelons of APHIS as:
 APHIS' Acting Administrator since September 2001
 Associate Administrator since 1999
 Deputy Administrator for APHIS' Wildlife Services program for nearly a decade prior

Acord has received two Presidential Rank Awards for his contributions to the USDA.  He holds a Bachelor of Science degree in animal science from West Virginia University in Morgantown.

External links
Biography in USDA News.

United States Department of Agriculture officials
West Virginia University alumni
Year of birth missing (living people)
Living people
Place of birth missing (living people)
George W. Bush administration personnel